Karl Doppler (12 September 1825, Lemberg10 March 1900, Stuttgart) was a Hungarian flute virtuoso, conductor, music director, composer. He was the younger brother of the composer Franz Doppler and father of the composer Árpád Doppler.

He worked until 1865 as music director at the Theater in Budapest, and from 1865 to 1898 as the Hofkapellmeister in Stuttgart. He composed several Hungarian operas, a collection of Hungarian folk dances and choirs.

Works 
 A gránátos tábor, 1853 (The Grenadier Camp)

References 
 

1825 births
1900 deaths
19th-century Hungarian people
19th-century classical musicians
19th-century conductors (music)
19th-century classical composers
German Romantic composers
German opera composers
Male opera composers
Hungarian classical composers
German male classical composers
Hungarian flautists
German classical flautists
Hungarian conductors (music)
Hungarian male musicians
Male conductors (music)
German conductors (music)
German male conductors (music)
Austro-Hungarian people
Hungarian expatriates in Poland
Hungarian expatriates in Germany
Musicians from Lviv
Musicians from Stuttgart
19th-century German composers
20th-century flautists